Together Everybody Achieves More (TEAM) Unity  was an electoral alliance in the Philippines that contested the 2007 Philippine general election. TEAM Unity's candidates were supporters of President Gloria Macapagal Arroyo and her administration. The alliance sought to win several Senate and House seats to protect Arroyo from impeachment attempts. Politicians who opposed the Arroyo administration formed their own electoral alliance, Genuine Opposition (GO), to challenge TEAM Unity.

In the Senate election, TEAM Unity won only 2 of the 12 contested seats. In 2011, as a result of an electoral protest, TEAM Unity's Senator Migz Zubiri lost his seat to GO's Koko Pimentel. TEAM Unity was more successful in the House elections, winning 142 of the 218 district seats.

Etymology
During the Lakas–CMD National Convention last April 12, President Gloria Macapagal Arroyo devised an acronym for the 12 senatorial candidates of TEAM Unity which is: "Ma S P A R A S A Ki D Z Mo" (in English, More for your kids.) Ma stands for Magsaysay, S stands for Singson, P stands for Pichay, A stands for Angara, R stands for Recto, A stands for Arroyo,  S stands for Sotto, A stands for Aquino-Oreta, Ki stands for Kiram, D stands for Defensor, Z stands for Zubiri, and Mo stands for Montano.

Program
TEAM UNITY's slogan and main program for Filipinos was "Our priority agenda is to work for the future of our children." while their secondary slogan was "Tulong Tulong sa Pagsulong". The opposing party, Genuine Opposition, used the slogan: Plan Co Revolt (in English, My plan is to revolt) as a demonstrative threat to the Arroyo government.

Coalition members

Mainstream party members 
 Lakas–CMD
 Kabalikat ng Malayang Pilipino (KAMPI)
 Nationalist People's Coalition (NPC-Teodoro wing)
 Liberal Party (LP-Atienza wing)
 Laban ng Demokratikong Pilipino (LDP)
 Partido Demokratiko Sosyalista ng Pilipinas (PDSP)

TEAM Unity Senatorial slate

Campaign team 
 Reli German - Campaign Manager
 Tourism Secretary Joseph Ace Durano - Spokesperson
 Tonypet Albano - Deputy Spokesperson
 Ben Evardone - Media Director

Party jingle 
The jingle was originated from the song "We Will Rock You" for their early promotional campaign.

Election results 
2 out of 12 candidates won the possible 12 seats in the Senate namely: (in order of votes received)
 Edgardo Angara
 Joker Arroyo

See also
 Koalisyon ng Katapatan at Karanasan sa Kinabukasan (K-4), the name of the pro-Arroyo coalition in the 2004 elections.
 People Power Coalition, the name of pro-Arroyo coalition in the 2001 midterm elections.
 Lakas NUCD 1998 Senatorial Slate, the Ramos' administration's senatorial slate during the 1998 national elections
 Lakas-Laban Coalition, the name of the pro-Ramos coalition in the 1995 midterm elections.
 Genuine Opposition, TEAM Unity's rival coalition in the 2007 elections.
 Team PNoy

Notes

External links
TEAM Unity's Official Website

2007 in the Philippines
Defunct political party alliances in the Philippines